San Vincenti is a village in Tuscany, central Italy, administratively a frazione of the comune of Gaiole in Chianti, province of Siena. In the 2001 census, its population was 10.

References 

Frazioni of Gaiole in Chianti